UDDS stands for Urban Dynamometer Driving Schedule, and refers to a United States Environmental Protection Agency mandated dynamometer test on fuel economy that represents city driving conditions which is used for light duty vehicle testing.

It is also known as U.S. FTP-72 (Federal Test Procedure) cycle, LA-4 cycle, in Sweden as A10 or CVS (Constant Volume Sampler) cycle and in Australia as the ADR 27 (Australian Design Rules) cycle.

Though it was originally created as a reference point for fossil fueled vehicles, it is also used to give estimates on how many miles an electric vehicle will travel on a single charge.

See also
 FTP-75 driving cycle
 National Vehicle Fuel and Emissions Laboratory (NVFEL)

References

United States Environmental Protection Agency